Philip Phillips may refer to:

Philip Philipse (1663–1699), son of the first Lord of the Manor of Philipseborough, New York City
Philip Phillips (bishop) (died 1787), Irish Roman Catholic archbishop of Tuam
Philip Phillips (lawyer) (1807–1884), American lawyer and congressman
Philip Phillips (photographer) (19th century), merchant seaman and photographer
Philip Philips, mayor of Auckland, New Zealand, 1871–74
Philip Phillips (businessman) (1874–1959), American businessman and philanthropist and namesake of the community of Dr. Phillips, Florida
Philip Phillips (archaeologist) (1900–1994), American archaeologist
Phil Phillips (1931–2020), singer and songwriter
Philip Phillips (physicist), theoretical condensed matter physicist
Phillip Phillips (born 1990), singer and songwriter, winner of season 11 of American Idol
Phil Phillips, a puppet from the film The Happytime Murders